Gymnopilus fuscosquamulosus is a species of mushroom-forming fungus in the family Hymenogastraceae.

Description

Habitat and distribution
Gymnopilus fuscosquamulosus grows on the roots of buckeye and rhododendron. In North America, it has been collected from North Carolina, in June.

See also

List of Gymnopilus species

References

fuscosquamulosus
Fungi of North America
Fungi described in 1969
Taxa named by Lexemuel Ray Hesler